Huesa is a city located in the province of Jaén, Spain. According to the 2005 census (INE), the city had a population of 2,727 inhabitants.

Its principal agricultural activity is cultivating olives.

Demographic

References

Municipalities in the Province of Jaén (Spain)